The 2023 United States Women's Curling Championship was held from February 5 to 11, 2023 at the Denver Coliseum in Denver, Colorado. The event was held in conjunction with the 2023 United States Men's Curling Championship. This was the first Women's Championship in two years, after the 2022 Championship was cancelled due to the COVID-19 pandemic.

Qualification
Teams qualified for the event according to the following procedure:
 2022 Olympic representative (Team Peterson),
 Current season's World Junior Curling Championships representative (Team Scheel),
 Four highest-ranking teams (not already qualified) on the World Curling Federation YTD ranking system as of December 20, 2022 (Team Strouse, Team McMakin, Team Rhyme, Team Workin), and
 Highest-finishing team (not already qualified) in the two qualifying events: the Curling Stadium Contender Series (Team Bear), and the Curl Mesabi Classic (Team Anderson).

Teams
Eight teams participated in the 2023 national championship.

Round-robin standings 
Final round-robin standings

Playoffs

1 vs. 2
Friday, February 10, 2:00 pm

3 vs. 4
Friday, February 10, 2:00 pm

Semifinal
Friday, February 10, 7:00 pm

Final
Saturday, February 11, 4:00 pm

References

United States National Curling Championships
United States Women's
Curling, United States Women's
2023 in sports in Colorado
Sports competitions in Denver
2020s in Denver
Curling in Colorado